Mitembuka is a settlement in Kitui County, Kenya.

References 

Populated places in Eastern Province (Kenya)